Canal FDR, former TV O Povo (TV OP for short and TV People from Portuguese) is a television station in Fortaleza, Brazil. Station is a TV Cultura affiliate. The name O Povo refers a newspaper with the same name, owned by Grupo O Povo, owner of both.

History
TV O Povo went on air in July 2007, only rebroadcasting TV Cultura programming from São Paulo. Now, TV O Povo has local programs.

Within the TV model of public interest, non-state, the station works with cultural support. Merchandising is not part of the proposed editorial of TV O Povo.

With TV O Povo launch, TV Ceará (formerly TV Cultura affiliate) began broadcasting TV Brasil, public station of Brazilian Federal Government.

Besides being tuned by the free channel 48 UHF, TV O Povo is tuned by the cable channel 11 on TV Show and channel 21 on the NET Fortaleza.

References

Television stations in Brazil
Television channels and stations established in 2007
Mass media in Fortaleza
2007 establishments in Brazil